Luca Gádorfalvi (born 29 January 1976) is a Hungarian windsurfer. She competed in the 2000 Summer Olympics. She is also the sister of Áron Gádorfalvi.

References

1976 births
Living people
Sailors at the 2000 Summer Olympics – Mistral One Design
Hungarian female sailors (sport)
Hungarian windsurfers
Olympic sailors of Hungary
Female windsurfers